Matti: Hell Is for Heroes is a 2006 Finnish biographical film about Finnish skijumper Matti Nykänen. The film was directed by Aleksi Mäkelä and written by Marko Leino. With 461,665 views it was the most watched film in Finland in 2006.

Cast 
 Jasper Pääkkönen as Matti Nykänen, a four-time Olympic gold medalist
 Peter Franzén as Nick Nevada, a character based on Mike Sierra, Nykänen's manager
 Elina Hietala as Taina
 Juha Veijonen as Maisteri, based on Matti Pulli, a ski jumping coach
 Elina Knihtilä as Mirva, based on Mervi Tapola
 Jope Ruonansuu as Oksanen
 Kari Hietalahti as Hammer
 Jani Volanen as Nipa
 Jussi Lampi as Jorma Tapio
 Seppo Pääkkönen as Ensio Nykänen, Matti's father

Soundtrack 
The soundtrack album for the film, Musiikkia elokuvasta Matti, was released on January 11, 2006. It contains songs performed by Nykänen himself. Two tracks used in the film, "Pidä varas" and "Kingi" performed by Nykänen, were not included in the soundtrack album.

References

External links 
 
 

Finnish biographical films
Films about Olympic ski jumping
Films directed by Aleksi Mäkelä
Films shot in Finland
Skiing films
Sports films based on actual events
Films scored by Tuomas Kantelinen
Films set in the 1980s
Biographical films about sportspeople
Cultural depictions of skiers
Cultural depictions of Finnish men
2000s biographical films